"Overload" is a song by English rapper/producer Dot Rotten. The song was first released on 3 June 2012 in the United Kingdom as the third single from the rapper's upcoming debut studio album, Voices in My Head. The track heavily samples "Children"—the number-two hit from trance composer Robert Miles; and credits producers TMS as the featured artist. "Overload" was selected as BBC Radio 1 DJ Zane Lowe's Hottest Record in the World on 26 March 2012. The track debuted at number fifteen on the UK Singles Chart, marking Rotten's third appearance—also the highest peaking of these—after "Teardrop" (#24, 2011) and "Are You Not Entertained?" (#53, 2012).

Music video
A music video to accompany the release of "Overload" was first released onto YouTube on 8 May 2012 at a total length of three minutes and nine seconds.

Sections of the video were filmed in the Snowdonia National Park, around the Ogwen Valley and Nant Ffrancon area.

It was directed by a young British film-director called Quason Matthews.

Track listing

Charts

Release history

References

2012 singles
Dot Rotten songs
Mercury Records singles
2012 songs
Song recordings produced by TMS (production team)
Songs written by Peter Kelleher (songwriter)
Songs written by Tom Barnes (songwriter)
Songs written by Ben Kohn